Evita Elisabeth Leter (born July 5, 1995) is a Surinamese swimmer. She competed at the 2016 Summer Olympics in the women's 100 metre breaststroke event; her time of 1:14.96 in the heats did not qualify her for the semifinals. She hails from Paramaribo. In 2019, she represented Suriname at the 2019 World Aquatics Championships held in Gwangju, South Korea.

References

1995 births
Living people
Sportspeople from Paramaribo
Surinamese female swimmers
Olympic swimmers of Suriname
Swimmers at the 2016 Summer Olympics
Pan American Games competitors for Suriname
Swimmers at the 2015 Pan American Games
Competitors at the 2014 Central American and Caribbean Games
Swimmers at the 2019 Pan American Games
Female breaststroke swimmers
Florida Gulf Coast Eagles women's swimmers